Aphaenops chappuisi is a species of beetle in the subfamily Trechinae. It was described by Coiffait in 1955.

References

cahppuisi
Beetles described in 1955